Ansu Kanneh (born 2 December 2005) is a Liberian professional footballer who last played professionally for USL Championship side Phoenix Rising. He is currently plays college soccer for Grand Canyon University.

Club career
Born in Monrovia, Kanneh moved to the United States at a young age and began his career with the Phoenix Rush academy. In May 2020, Kanneh moved to the academy at Phoenix Rising. He then signed a USL academy contract with the club on 14 July at the age of 14, making him the youngest player to ever sign a contract with the club. Kanneh then made his professional debut for the club on 3 October against LA Galaxy II. He came on as an 87th-minute substitute for Darnell King as Phoenix Rising won 4–1.

Career statistics

Club

References

2005 births
Living people
People from Monrovia
Liberian footballers
American soccer players
Association football forwards
Phoenix Rising FC players
USL Championship players
Liberian emigrants to the United States